Earl Mitchell (born September 25, 1987) is a former American football defensive tackle. He was drafted by the Houston Texans in the third round of the 2010 NFL Draft. He played college football at Arizona.

College career
Mitchell attended the University of Arizona from 2006 to 2009.

Professional career

Houston Texans
Mitchell was drafted by the Houston Texans in the third round (81st overall) of the 2010 NFL Draft.

Miami Dolphins
On March 11, 2014, he was signed by the Miami Dolphins to a four-year, $16 million contract including $9 million guaranteed.

On September 13, 2016, Mitchell was placed on injured reserve. He was activated off injured reserve to the active roster on November 10, 2016, prior to Week 10.

On February 17, 2017, Mitchell was released by the Dolphins.

San Francisco 49ers
On February 24, 2017, Mitchell signed a four-year, $16 million contract with the San Francisco 49ers. In his first season in San Francisco, Mitchell started all 16 games, recording 33 combined tackles, one sack, and a career-high four passes defensed.

On January 23, 2019, the 49ers declined the two-year option on Mitchell's contract, making him a free agent in 2019.

Seattle Seahawks
On July 24, 2019, Mitchell was signed by the Seattle Seahawks. He was released on August 31, 2019.

On November 7, 2019, Mitchell announced his retirement from the NFL.

San Francisco 49ers (second stint)
On January 1, 2020, Mitchell came out of retirement and signed with the San Francisco 49ers. Mitchell reached Super Bowl LIV with 49ers, but lost 31–20 to the Kansas City Chiefs. Mitchell recorded 1 tackle and 0.5 sacks in the Super Bowl.

NFL statistics

Personal life 
Mitchell was born and raised in Houston, moving around with his mom, who separated from his dad. His grandma sometimes provided a home for him in the Trinity Garden neighborhood, but she died when Mitchell was 14 and Mitchell's dad died during his senior year in college.

References

External links
Miami Dolphins bio
Arizona Wildcats bio

1987 births
Living people
Players of American football from Houston
American football defensive tackles
Arizona Wildcats football players
Houston Texans players
Miami Dolphins players
San Francisco 49ers players
Seattle Seahawks players